The finals and the qualifying heats of the Men's 200 metres Freestyle event at the 1997 FINA Short Course World Championships were held on the first day of the championships, on Thursday, 17 April 1997 in Gothenburg, Sweden.

Finals

Qualifying heats

Remarks

See also
1996 Men's Olympic Games 200m Freestyle
1997 Men's European LC Championships 200m Freestyle

References
 Results

F